Coline Varcin (born 28 January 1993) is a retired French biathlete. She competed in the 2014/15 World Cup season, and represented France at the Biathlon World Championships 2015 in Kontiolahti.

References 

1993 births
Living people
People from Échirolles
French female biathletes
Sportspeople from Isère
21st-century French women